Manfred Razenböck (born 4 July 1978) is an Austrian former footballer who played as a goalkeeper.

See also
Football in Austria
List of football clubs in Austria

References

External links
Guardian's Stats Centre

1978 births
Living people
Austrian footballers
SC Wiener Neustadt players
Association football goalkeepers